Miloš Milojević may refer to:

 Miloš Milojević (lawyer) (1840-1897), Serbian lawyer, writer and politician
 Miloš Milojević (footballer) (born 1982), Serbian football manager and former player

See also
 Miloš Milošević (born 1972), Croatian swimmer